Lucas Stauffer (born April 21, 1995) is an American soccer player who plays as a full back for USL Championship side Las Vegas Lights.

Career

College 
Stauffer played four years of college soccer at Creighton University between 2014 and 2017. During his time at Creighton, Stauffer was named Big East Conference All-Rookie Team in 2014, First Team All-Big East Conference in 2016, and USC Second Team All-Great Lakes Region and First Team All-Big East Conference in 2017.

While at college, Stauffer spent time with Premier Development League sides Portland Timbers U23s, Ocala Stampede and Des Moines Menace.

Professional 
On January 17, 2018, Stauffer was selected 26th overall in the 2018 MLS SuperDraft by Vancouver Whitecaps FC. However, he was not signed by the club.

On April 18, 2018, Stauffer joined United Soccer League side New York Red Bulls II. On May 2, 2018, he made his professional debut for New York, appearing as a starter in a 0–0 draw with Ottawa Fury. On June 9, 2018, Stauffer scored his first goal as a professional in New York's 4–2 victory over Charlotte Independence.

Ahead of the German 2019–20 season, Stauffer joined FSV Wacker 90 Nordhausen on a one-year contract.

On February 15, 2023, Stauffer returned to the United States, signing with USL Championship side Las Vegas Lights FC.

References

External links

Creighton Bluejays bio

1995 births
Living people
American soccer players
Creighton Bluejays men's soccer players
Portland Timbers U23s players
Ocala Stampede players
Des Moines Menace players
New York Red Bulls II players
FSV Wacker 90 Nordhausen players
FC Carl Zeiss Jena players
Las Vegas Lights FC players
USL League Two players
USL Championship players
Regionalliga players
Association football defenders
Soccer players from Kentucky
Vancouver Whitecaps FC draft picks
People from Owensboro, Kentucky
American men's futsal players
Expatriate men's footballers in Denmark
American expatriate soccer players
American expatriate soccer players in Germany